Dos caras tiene el destino, is a Mexican telenovela that aired on  Canal 4, Telesistema Mexicano in 1960.

Plot 
Maricruz Olivier plays a woman with two personalities: one is Marga, a very shy child and family and the other woman is Rita, a very wild girl who likes clubs and costumes. Maricruz playing with these characters extremely well.

Cast 
 Maricruz Olivier as Marga / Rita
 Magda Guzmán
 Alicia Montoya
 Aurora Molina
 José Solé
 Marco de Carlo
 Rafael Bertrand
 Rafael Llamas
 Julio Monterde
 Magda Donato
 Pilar Souza
 Armando Arriola
 Carmen Salas
 Luis Beristáin

Production 
Original Story:  Ernesto Alonso
Adaptation: Ernesto Alonso
Managing Director: José Morris

References 

1960 telenovelas
Mexican telenovelas
Televisa telenovelas
Television shows set in Mexico City
1960 Mexican television series debuts
1960 Mexican television series endings
Spanish-language telenovelas